Ad. Lautem or Associação Desportiva Lautem is a football club of East Timor from Lautém District. The team plays in the Taça Digicel.

References

Football clubs in East Timor
Football
Association football clubs established in 2010
2010 establishments in East Timor
Lautém Municipality